André Chabot is a Canadian politician who served as the councillor for Ward 10 of the Calgary City Council. He was elected in a 2005 by-election after Incumbent Margot Aftergood resigned after allegations of a vote rigging scandal surfaced involving mail in ballots from the 2004 Calgary municipal elections.

André Chabot represents the communities of Mayland Heights, Vista Heights, Abbeydale, Albert Park/Radisson Heights, Applewood, Forest Heights, Forest Lawn, Marlborough, Marlborough Park, Penbrooke Meadows and Red Carpet/Mountview, in the city's southeast quadrant.

In 2006, he opposed a bylaw that would have made it an offence to spit, urinate, defecate, loiter, fight or show a knife in public.

In 2007, he pushed for a bylaw to allow ashtrays at entry points into public buildings in an effort to avoid garbage created by discarded butts.

On June 25, 2015, Chabot announced he intended to run for mayor of Calgary in the 2017 municipal election. His bid was ultimately unsuccessful. In January 2021, Chabot announced he would run for the Ward 10 councillor seat in the 2021 Calgary municipal election.

References

External links

City of Calgary Ward 10 homepage

Living people
Calgary city councillors
Year of birth missing (living people)